Meall Fuar-mhonaidh is a hill on the west side of Loch Ness, in the Highlands of Scotland. At 699 m in height, it is listed as a Graham and a Marilyn.

Its rounded shape and prominent position make it a distinctive landmark, visible from along much of Loch Ness.

Meall Fuar-mhonaidh is usually climbed from Grotaig, a hamlet at the end of minor road to the south-west of Drumnadrochit. From there a footpath passes through woods, then out onto moorland. This path climbs south-west along the ridge of Meall Fuar-mhonaidh to the summit.

References

Mountains and hills of Highland (council area)
Marilyns of Scotland
Grahams
Loch Ness